Victorville, a city in San Bernardino County, California, United States.

Victorville may also refer to:
 Victor Valley Transportation Center, the Victorville train station in Victorville, California, United States
 George Air Force Base, a former United States military base formerly named Victorville Army Airfield (1941–1948) and Victorville Air Force Base (1948–1950)
 Victorville Army Airfield auxiliary fields of World War II
 Victorville Airport, officially Southern California Logistics Airport, a public airport in Victorville, California, United States
 Federal Correctional Complex, Victorville, a U.S. prison complex in Victorville, California, which includes:
Federal Correctional Institution, Victorville, a medium-security prison; and 
United States Penitentiary, Victorville, a high-security prison
 Victorville shoulderband, a species of gastropod in the family Helminthoglyptidae